is a Japanese light novel author. In 2000, his work Kino's Journey was a finalist for the 6th Dengeki Novel Prize, and was subsequently serialized in Dengeki hp magazine in March of the same year, marking his debut. Kino's Journey proved popular, and has continued in serialization (as well as collected bunko releases) since that time.

The author's name, a pen name, was derived from SIG Sauer, a firearms manufacturer, and "a manga hero", definitely Keiichi Morisato from Oh My Goddess!, according to the afterword in the second volume of Gakuen Kino. He loves to travel, ride his motorcycle, and is a self-professed "gun maniac". He mentions Galaxy Express 999 and the works of Hayao Miyazaki as some of his primary influences.

Works
Kino's Journey
Gakuen Kino
Tale of a Single Continent series
Allison
Lillia and Treize
Meg and Seron
Bludgeoning Angel Dokuro-Chan desu (collective writing)
Ocha ga Hakobaretekuru Made ni: A Book At Cafe (January 2010)
Yoru ga Hakobaretekuru Made ni: A Book in A Bed (December 2010)
Kotae ga Hakobaretekuru Made ni: A Book without Answers (December 2011)
Danshi Kōkōsei de Urekko Light Novel Sakka o Shiteiru Keredo, Toshishita no Classmate de Seiyū no Onnanoko ni Kubi o Shimerareteiru (January 2014)
Sword Art Online Alternative Gun Gale Online

See also 
 Kouhaku Kuroboshi
 ASCII Media Works

References

External links 
  
 

1972 births
20th-century Japanese novelists
21st-century Japanese novelists
Living people
Light novelists